Ronny Marcos (born 1 October 1993) is a professional footballer who plays as a left back for Kickers Offenbach. Born in Germany, he represents the Mozambique national team at international level.

Club career
Marcos began his senior career with Hansa Rostock and made his debut for the club in August 2012, as a substitute for Alexandre Mendy in a 4–1 win over SV Babelsberg 03 in the 3. Liga. In January 2014 he signed for Hamburger SV II.

He made his Bundesliga debut with the club's first team on 29 November 2014 in a match against FC Augsburg.

He moved to Greuther Fürth on 9 January 2016.

Marcos joined Kickers Offenbach in July 2019.

International career
Marcos was born in Germany to parents of Mozambican descent. He made his debut for Mozambique in an Africa Cup of Nations qualifier against Rwanda on 14 June 2015 in Maputo.

References

External links

1993 births
Living people
People from Ostholstein
German people of Mozambican descent
Mozambican footballers
German footballers
Footballers from Schleswig-Holstein
Association football defenders
Mozambique international footballers
2. Bundesliga players
3. Liga players
Austrian Football Bundesliga players
FC Hansa Rostock players
Hamburger SV players
SpVgg Greuther Fürth players
SV Ried players
FC Eintracht Norderstedt 03 players
Kickers Offenbach players
Mozambican expatriate footballers
Mozambican expatriate sportspeople in Austria
Expatriate footballers in Austria